Chathamattom is a village in Ernakulam District, Kerala, India.

Agriculture is the main occupation of people. Ginger, turmeric, coconut, cocoa, paddy, black pepper, plantain and tapioca are commonly cultivated. The main production and staple food is rice. The nearest towns are Kothamangalam, Muvattupuzha, and Thodupuzha.

There is an attractive environmental sight seeing place namely 'Pothencheeni kunnu' (Hill above 300 meters height), give a view of the metro city Kochi in good weather condition and good place for trekking.

Chathamattom is a place of historical importance. The ordnance factory of the ancient kingdom (Thrikkariyoor-the oldest capital of Chera Dynasty) was situated here.  At that time Chathamattom was known as Shasthavumattom.  Black melted stones or dross (keedon kallukal) broken into pieces when thrown in fire are commonly in some dry lands here is an evidence for ordnance factory.

References 

Villages in Ernakulam district